John Elliott Curran (May 25, 1848 – May 18, 1890) was an American author.

Curran, son of John C. and Mary L. Curran, was born in Utica, New York, May 25, 1848.

Literary career 

He graduated from Yale College in 1870.  After nearly a year of European travel he pursued the study of law, at first in Utica, and then in the Law School of Columbia College, where he was graduated in May 1873.  He practiced his profession for some years in New York City, but finally abandoned it for literary work, which had long interested him.  He published one novel, Miss Frances Merley, in 1888, and a number of stories in magazines. He also did some newspaper work in New York.  His residence was in Englewood, New Jersey, where he died on May 18, 1890, at the age of 42, of heart-failure, following a week's illness of pneumonia and pleurisy.

Personal life  

He married Eliza P., youngest daughter of Captain James H. Mulford, of New York City, who survived him with three children.

References

External links 

 
 Miss Frances Merley
 Livingston Family Papers. General Collection, Beinecke Rare Book and Manuscript Library, Yale University.

1848 births
1890 deaths
American male novelists
Yale College alumni
Columbia Law School alumni
New York (state) lawyers
Writers from Utica, New York
Deaths from pneumonia in New Jersey
Novelists from New York (state)
19th-century American lawyers